Endothelin receptor type A, also known as ETA, is a human G protein-coupled receptor.

Interactions 

Endothelin receptor type A has been shown to interact with HDAC7A and HTATIP.

See also 
 Endothelin receptor

References

External links

Further reading 

 
 
 
 
 
 
 
 
 
 
 
 
 
 
 
 
 
 
 
 
 
 

G protein-coupled receptors